Hoxton Hall is a performance arts theatre and community centre in the Hoxton area of Shoreditch, at 130 Hoxton Street, in the London Borough of Hackney.

A grade II* listed building, the theatre was first built as a Music hall in 1863, as MacDonald's Music hall. It is an unrestored example of the saloon-style. In the theatre, an iron-railed, two tier galleried auditorium rises on three sides, supported on cast iron columns, above a small, high, multi-tiered stage. It survives, largely in its original form, as for many years it was used as a Quaker meeting house.

The music hall lost its performance licence in 1871, due to complaints by the police; it was sold, and the new owners applied for a licence in 1876, but were again rejected. William Isaac Palmer (1824–1893) purchased it on behalf of the Blue Ribbon Gospel Temperance Mission in 1879. Palmer was an heir to the Huntley and Palmer biscuit family and spent much of his fortune on charity. On Palmer's death, the hall passed to the Bedford Institute, a  Quaker organisation dedicated to running adult schools and alleviating the results of poverty.

Today, the hall is used as a community centre and performance space.

Notable recent performances
On invitation from Lisa Goldman, artistic director of award-winning theatre company The Red Room, Leo Asemota created video installations and a portfolio of photographic portraits of Hoxton residents for the site-specific production Hoxton Story which opened at Hoxton Hall, to performances on 10 September 2005
Robert Newman filmed a television programme entitled A History of Oil for More4, at the Hoxton Hall (later released on DVD). A mixture of stand-up comedy and introductory lecture on geopolitics and peak oil, in the show, based on his touring show, Apocalypso Now Newman argues that twentieth-century Western foreign policy, including World War I, should be seen as a continuous struggle by the West to control Middle Eastern oil. The peak oil projection is based on Richard Heinberg's book The Party's Over: Oil, War, and the Fate of Industrial Societies.

References

 Guide to British Theatres 1750-1950, John Earl and Michael Sell pp. 118–9 (Theatres Trust,  2000)

External links
Olive Yarrow's Memories of Hoxton Hall
Hackney Theatre Partnership
Hoxton Hall official site
Theatres Trust database entry
Related documents dating from 1863 held at the University of East London's East London Theatre Archive

Community centres in London
Grade II* listed buildings in the London Borough of Hackney
Music hall venues in the United Kingdom
Theatres in the London Borough of Hackney
Grade II* listed theatres
Hoxton
Shoreditch